Aidman may refer to:

 Medic (medical aidman)
 Combat medic
 A position in the Special Forces Group (Belgium)
 Charles Aidman (1925–1993) U.S. actor

See also

 Corpsman
 Aid (disambiguation)
 Man (disambiguation)